Danum may refer to:

 Doncaster in England, known as  under the Romans
 The Danum Academy in Doncaster
 The Danum Platform in Antarctica, named for the British town
 Mount Danum in Malaysia
 The Danum Valley Conservation Area in Malaysia
 The Ot Danum people or their language in Indonesia

See also
 Enyo ocypete, a species of moth formerly sometimes known as Sphinx danum